Serge Reggiani (2 May 1922 – 23 July 2004) was an Italian-French actor and singer. He was born in Reggio Emilia, Italy and moved to France with his parents at the age of eight.

After studying acting at the Conservatoire des arts cinématographiques, he was discovered by Jean Cocteau and appeared in the wartime production of Les Parents terribles. He then left Paris to join the French Resistance.

His first feature film was Les portes de la nuit ("Gates of the Night"), released in 1946. He went on to perform in 80 films in total, including Casque d'or, Les Misérables (1958),Tutti a casa, Le Doulos, Il Gattopardo, La terrazza, The Pianist (1998).

Reggiani also triumphed in the theatre in 1959 with his performance in Jean-Paul Sartre's play Les Séquestrés d'Altona.  In 1961, Reggiani co-starred with Paul Newman and Sidney Poitier in the film Paris Blues, filmed on location in Paris.

In 1965, at the age of 43, he began a second career as a singer, with the help of Simone Signoret and her husband Yves Montand, and later with the assistance of the French singer Barbara. Reggiani became one of the most acclaimed performers of French chanson and although he was in his 40s, his rugged image made him popular with both younger and older listeners. His best-known songs include Les loups sont entrés dans Paris ("The Wolves Have Entered Paris") and Sarah (La femme qui est dans mon lit) ("The Woman Who Is in My Bed"), the latter written by Georges Moustaki. He regularly sang songs by Boris Vian (Le Déserteur, Arthur où t'as mis le corps, La Java des bombes atomiques). His new young fans identified with his left-wing ideals and anti-militarism, most notably during the student revolts in France in 1968. With age he became more and more acclaimed as one of the best interpreters of the chanson, and also for bringing the poems of Rimbaud, Apollinaire, and Prévert to new audiences.

From 1980, when his son died, Reggiani struggled with alcoholism and depression. In 1995, however, he made a comeback to singing, giving a few concerts despite his deteriorated health and personal distress, the last one being held as late as the spring of 2004.

In later life, he became a painter and gave a number of exhibitions of his works.

Serge Reggiani died in Paris of a heart attack at the age of 82, one day after the death of another well-known French singer, Sacha Distel. He is buried in Montparnasse Cemetery.

Selected filmography

 Boys' School (1938) – Un élève (uncredited)
 Conflict (1938) – (uncredited)
 Night in December (1940) – Un figurant
 Saturnin de Marseille (1941)
 Strange Inheritance (1943) – Bob Éloi
 Le carrefour des enfants perdus (1944) – Joris
 François Villon (1945) – François Villon
 Star Without Light (1946) – Gaston Lansac
 Gates of the Night (1946) – Guy Sénéchal
Coincidences (1947) – Jean Ménétrier
 La fleur de l'âge (1947)
 Manù il contrabbandiere (1948) – Manuel Ambrosini, detto 'Manù'
 Under the Cards (1948) – Manu
 The Lovers Of Verona (1949) – Angelo (Romeo)
 Manon (1949) – Leon Lescaut
 The Mystery of the Yellow Room (1949) – Joseph Rouletabille
 Return to Life (1949) – Louis, le mari de la jeune allemande (segment 5 : Le retour de Louis")
 Au royaume des cieux (1949) – Pierre Massot
 The Perfume of the Lady in Black (1949) – Joseph Rouletabille
 La Ronde (1950) – Franz the Soldier
 Old Boys of Saint-Loup (1950) – L'abbé Paul Forestier
 Good Enough to Eat (1951) – Jean-Louis dit Loup
 Secret People (1952) – Louis
 Casque d'or (1952) – Georges Manda
 Red Shirts (Anita Garibaldi, 1952) – Lantini
 The King and the Mockingbird (1952) – The chimney sweep (voice)
 Storms (1953) – Sergio Parnell
 The World Condemns Them (1953) – André
 Act of Love (1953) – Claude Lacaud
 Napoléon (1955) – Lucien Bonaparte
 The Wicked Go to Hell (1955) – Rudel
 The Doll That Took the Town (1957) – Mario Grimaldi
 Élisa (1957) – Bernard Voisin
 Échec au porteur (1958) – Bastien Sassey
 Les Misérables (1958) – Enjolras
 The Stowaway (1958) – Alfred Mougins
 Marie-Octobre (1959) – Antoine Rougier
 Everybody Go Home (1960) – Assunto Ceccarelli
 Paris Blues (1961) – Michel "Gypsy" Devigne
 Warriors Five (1962) – Libero
 Le Doulos (1962) – Maurice Faugel
 The Leopard (1963) – Don Francisco Ciccio Tumeo
 L'enfer (1964) – Marcel #1
 Marie-Chantal contre le docteur Kha (1965) – Ivanov
 The 25th Hour (1967) – Trajan Koruga
 The Last Adventure (1967) – The pilot
 Il giorno della civetta (1968) – Parrinieddu
 The Seven Cervi Brothers (1968) – Inmate Ferrari
 Army of Shadows (L'Armée des ombres, 1969) – The hairdresser
  (1971) – François Nolan
 Trois milliards sans ascenseur (1972) – Pierrot
  (1972) – Thia
 Don't Touch the White Woman! (1974) – The Mad Indian
 Vincent, François, Paul... et les autres (1974) – Paul
 Le Chat et la souris (1975) – Lechat
 The Good and the Bad (1976) – Le chef de la résistance
 Une fille cousue de fil blanc (1977) – Jérôme
 Violette & François (1977) – Père de François
 Solemn Communion (1977) – Le récitant chanteur (voice)
 La terrazza (1980) – Sergio
 L'empreinte des géants (1980) – Fouldroule
 Fantastica (1980) – Euclide Brown
 The Beekeeper (1986) – Sick Man
 Mauvais Sang (1986) – Charlie
 Let Sleeping Cops Lie (Ne réveillez pas un flic qui dort, 1988) – Le Stéphanois
 Coupe-franche (1989) – Mathieu
 There Were Days... and Moons (1990) – Sophie's father
 I Hired a Contract Killer (1990) – Vic of Vic's French Burgers
 Plein fer (1990) – Emilio
 De force avec d'autres (1993) – Sergio
  (1993) – Dr. Levy
 Le petit garçon (1995) – Germain
 Héroïnes (1997) – Montgolfier
 The Pianist (1998) – Rossell mayor

External links

Biography 

 

1922 births
2004 deaths
French male stage actors
French male film actors
20th-century French painters
20th-century French male artists
French male painters
21st-century French painters
21st-century French male artists
People of Emilian descent
Italian emigrants to France
Italian male film actors
People from Reggio Emilia
Burials at Montparnasse Cemetery
20th-century French male singers
Officiers of the Légion d'honneur
Commanders of the Ordre national du Mérite
Commandeurs of the Ordre des Arts et des Lettres